The term Orthodox Patriarch may refer to:

Eastern Orthodoxy
 Ecumenical Patriarch of Constantinople, head of the Greek Orthodox Church of Constantinople
 Greek Orthodox Patriarch of Alexandria, head of the Greek Orthodox Church of Alexandria
 Greek Orthodox Patriarch of Antioch, head of the Greek Orthodox Church of Antioch
 Greek Orthodox Patriarch of Jerusalem, head of the Greek Orthodox Church of Jerusalem
 Russian Orthodox Patriarch, head of the Russian Orthodox Church
 Serbian Orthodox Patriarch, head of the Serbian Orthodox Church
 Bulgarian Orthodox Patriarch, head of the Bulgarian Orthodox Church
 Romanian Orthodox Patriarch, head of the Romanian Orthodox Church
 Georgian Orthodox Patriarch, head of the Georgian Orthodox Church

Oriental Orthodoxy
 Coptic Orthodox Patriarch of Alexandria, head of the Coptic Orthodox Church of Alexandria
 Syriac Orthodox Patriarch of Antioch, head of the Syriac Orthodox Church of Antioch
 Armenian Orthodox Patriarch of Jerusalem, head of the Armenian Orthodox Church of Jerusalem
 Armenian Orthodox Patriarch of Constantinople, head of the Armenian Orthodox Church of Constantinople
 Ethiopian Orthodox Patriarch, head of the Ethiopian Orthodox Tewahedo Church
 Eritrean Orthodox Patriarch, head of the Eritrean Orthodox Tewahedo Church

See also
 Orthodox (disambiguation)
 Patriarch (disambiguation)